{{Infobox legislature
|background_color=green
|house_type=Unicameral
|meeting_place=Jatiya Sangsad Bhaban,  Sher-e-Bangla Nagar, Dhaka, Bangladesh
|next_election1=January 2024 (Twelfth Jatiya Sangsad Election)
|last_election1=Eleventh Jatiya Sangsad Election
|political_groups1=Government
 ALOpposition
 JP (E)
 WPB
 JSD
 BDB
 GF
 JP (M)
 BTF
Others
 Independent
|members=350 
|leader4=Rowshan Ershad
|leader4_type=Leader of the Opposition
|leader3=Sheikh Hasina
|leader3_type=Leader of the House
|leader2=Shamsul Hoque Tuku|leader2_type=Deputy Speaker
|leader1=Shirin Sharmin Chaudhury
|leader1_type=Speaker
|structure1_res=240px
|name=Eleventh Jatiya Sangsad
|structure1=Bangladesh_Jatiya Sangsad_2018.svg
|session_room=Sangshad Assembly Hall.jpg
|disbanded=
|foundation=
|term_limits=
|succeeded_by=
|preceded_by=Tenth Jatiya Sangsad
|logo_caption=Flag of the Sangsad
|logo_res=180 px
|logo_pic=Flag of the Jatiyo Sangsad.png
|coa_caption=Seal of Jatiya Sangsad
|coa_res=150 px
|coa_pic=
|website=http://www.parliament.gov.bd/}}

The Eleventh Jatiya Sangsad''' was formed with the elected members of the 11th General Election of Bangladesh 2018. The Parliament was sworn in on the 3rd January 2019. On seventh January the Ministers were sworn in. On the January 30th first session of the parliament took place. Out of the 350 seats 300 members are directly elected by the people and rest 50 seats are reserved for women and are filled by proportional representation. Awami League won 258 seats out of the 300 seats and formed the government under the leadership of Sheikh Hasina Jatiya Party got 22 seats and became the main opposition party.

Prominent members

Members

Sessions

First 
On 30 January 2019 the first session of Eleventh Sangsad was started and this session ended on the 11th March after 26 working days. In the beginning of the session President Abdul Hamid addressed the house. 194 members attended the discussion on the Presidential Address and after 54 hours and 57 minutes a tanking proposal was passed. A total of five bills were passed in this session and 50 parliamentary committees were formed within 10 working days. According to Rule-71 of the Rules of Procedure of the Bangladesh Parliament, 321 notices were submitted in this session out of which 30 were accepted and 18 were discussed. As per Rule 71 (a), 155 more notices were discussed.। Out of 114 questions submitted for the Leader of Parliament, 48 questions were answered. Of the 2,325 questions submitted to the ministers, 1,630 were answered. During the session, Sultan Mohammad Mansur Ahmed of Gano Forum was sworn in on 7 March.  Members of the reserved women's seat were sworn in on 20 February.

Second 
The second session of the parliament started on April 24, 2019 and ended after 5 working days. During the second session, five members elected from the Bangladesh Nationalist Party took oath. According to the Rules of Procedure of the Parliament of Bangladesh, 71 notices were submitted in this session out of which 9 were accepted and 1 was discussed. Besides, 44 notices under Rule 71 (a) were discussed. Out of 44 questions submitted for the Leader of Parliament, 11 questions were answered. Of the 1,040 questions submitted for ministers, 365 were answered.

References

Parliament of Bangladesh